Northern Rock is a former bank of the United Kingdom.

Northern Rock may also refer to:
 Northern Rock (R&ER locomotive)
 Northern Rock (Asset Management) or NRAM Limited
 Northern Rock All*Star Cup
 Northern rock barnacle
 Northern Rock Foundation
 Northern rock mouse, a rodent
 Northern rock sole, a flatfish
 Northern Rock Tower

See also
 Nationalisation of Northern Rock
 Southern Rock